Rachid Neqrouz (born 10 April 1972) is a former Moroccan former football defender, who played for Young Boys Bern in Switzerland and A.S. Bari in Italy. He retired in 2003, after being released for free by Bari.

Career
Neqrouz made over 100 appearances in Serie A for Bari.

He played for the Morocco national football team and was a participant at the 1994 FIFA World Cup and at the 1998 FIFA World Cup.

References

1972 births
Moroccan footballers
Morocco international footballers
Moroccan expatriate footballers
Serie A players
Serie B players
BSC Young Boys players
S.S.C. Bari players
Expatriate footballers in Italy
Expatriate footballers in Switzerland
Living people
1994 FIFA World Cup players
1998 FIFA World Cup players
2000 African Cup of Nations players
MC Oujda players
Botola players
Association football defenders
People from Errachidia
Moroccan expatriate sportspeople in Switzerland
Moroccan expatriate sportspeople in Italy
Competitors at the 1993 Mediterranean Games
Mediterranean Games competitors for Morocco